The Jabiru toadlet (Uperoleia arenicola) is a species of frog in the family Myobatrachidae.
It is endemic to Australia.
Its natural habitats are subtropical or tropical dry lowland grassland and intermittent rivers.

References

Uperoleia
Amphibians of the Northern Territory
Taxonomy articles created by Polbot
Amphibians described in 1981
Frogs of Australia